Antonio da Silva or Anthony Silva or variants may refer to:

Anthony Silva (politician) (born 1974), American politician and mayor of Stockton, California
António Silva (footballer) (born 2003), Portuguese football defender
Antônio Silva (football manager) (born 1952), Brazilian football manager in Japan
Antônio Silva (fighter) (born 1979), Brazilian mixed martial artist
António Silva (actor) (1886–1971), Portuguese actor
Antônio da Silva (footballer) (born 1978), Brazilian footballer
Toni Conceição (António Conceição da Silva Oliveira, "Toni", born 1961), Portuguese footballer
Antônio Tenório Silva (born 1970), Brazilian judoka
Toñito Silva (Antonio Silva Delgado, fl. from 1993), Puerto Rican politician
Anthony da Silva (born 1980), or Tony, Portuguese footballer
Antony Silva (Antony Domingo Silva Cano, born 1984), Paraguayan football goalkeeper
Tony Silva (born 1960), American aviculturist
Toni Silva (born 1993), Bissau-Guinean footballer
Tony Sylva (born 1975), Senegalese footballer

See also
Lucas Silva (footballer, born 1984) (Lucas Antônio Silva de Oliveira), Brazilian footballer